Ahmadabad-e Khazai (also Romanized as Aḩmadābād-e Khazā’ī; also known as Aḩmadābād) is a village in Pain Rokh Rural District, Jolgeh Rokh District, Torbat-e Heydarieh County, Razavi Khorasan Province, Iran. At the 2006 census, its population was 931, in 217 families.

See also 

 List of cities, towns and villages in Razavi Khorasan Province

References 

Populated places in Torbat-e Heydarieh County